Bandit King of Texas is a 1949 American Western film directed by Fred C. Brannon and written by Olive Cooper. The film stars Allan Lane, Eddy Waller, Helene Stanley, James Nolan, Harry Lauter and Robert Bice. The film was released on August 29, 1949, by Republic Pictures.

Plot

Cast     
Allan Lane as Rocky Lane 
Black Jack as Rocky's Horse
Eddy Waller as Nugget Clark
Helene Stanley as Cynthia Turner
James Nolan as Dan McCabe 
Harry Lauter as Trem Turner
Robert Bice as Henchman Gus
John Hamilton as Marshal John Turner
Lane Bradford as Henchman Cal Barker
George Lloyd as Thatch Dobson 
Steve Clark as Tom Samson
I. Stanford Jolley as Land Agent Willets
Danni Sue Nolan as Emily Baldwin 
Richard Emory as Jim Baldwin

References

External links 
 

1949 films
American Western (genre) films
1949 Western (genre) films
Republic Pictures films
Films directed by Fred C. Brannon
American black-and-white films
1940s English-language films
1940s American films